Jacqueline Lévi-Valensi (1932–2004) was a French academic.

References 

1932 births
2004 deaths
Academic staff of the University of Picardy Jules Verne